Daniel Tynell (born 6 January 1976 in Grycksbo, Dalarna) is a Swedish retired cross-country skier who won the ski marathon Vasaloppet three times, in 2002, 2006 and 2009, and came in second in the 2010, 2011 and 2013 marathons. Tynell also won the König Ludwig Lauf, an event that is part of Worldloppet Ski Federation, twice. He represented the ski club Grycksbo IF.

In March 2015, Tynell had a heart attack which prevented him from participating in that year's Vasaloppet. Shortly thereafter, he announced that he was retiring from skiing due to his heart problems.

Cross-country skiing results
All results are sourced from the International Ski Federation (FIS).

World Cup

Season standings

Individual podiums
1 victory 
1 podium

References

1976 births
Living people
People from Falun Municipality
Cross-country skiers from Dalarna County
Swedish male cross-country skiers
Vasaloppet winners